Following page lists various days of celebration/mourning/remembrance of Shi'a Muslims.

Twelvers

The following is a list of days of celebration/mourning/remembrance as observed by Twelver Shia Muslims:

References

 Jaffery Welfare Trust: 2009 Islamic calendar

 
History of Shia Islam
Lists of days